Kamam is a village in Shaheed Bhagat Singh Nagar district of Punjab State, India. The village is administrated by Sarpanch, an elected representative of the village.

Demography 
As of 2011, Kamam has a total number of 383 houses and population of 1958 of which 982 include are males while 976 are females according to the report published by Census India in 2011. The literacy rate of Kamam is 80.51%, higher than the state average of 75.84%. The population of children under the age of 6 years is 203 which is 10.37% of total population of Kamam, and child sex ratio is approximately 1183 as compared to Punjab state average of 846.

Most of the people are from Schedule Caste which constitutes 70.63% of total population in Kamam. The town does not have any Schedule Tribe population so far.

As per the report published by Census India in 2011, 507 people were engaged in work activities out of the total population of Kamam which includes 481 males and 26 females. According to census survey report 2011, 69.63% workers describe their work as main work and 30.37% workers are involved in Marginal activity providing livelihood for less than 6 months.

Education 
The village has a Punjabi medium, co-ed primary school founded in 1911. The school provide mid-day meal as per Indian Midday Meal Scheme. As per Right of Children to Free and Compulsory Education Act the school provide free education to children between the ages of 6 and 14.

Amardeep Singh Shergill Memorial college Mukandpur and Sikh National College Banga are the nearest colleges.

Transport 

See also 
List of villages in India

References

External links 
 Tourism of Punjab
 Census of Punjab
 Locality Based PINCode

Villages in Shaheed Bhagat Singh Nagar district